Thomas Foley or Tom Foley may refer to:

Political figures
 Thomas Foley (Australian politician) (1853–1920), member of the Queensland Legislative Assembly
 Thomas C. Foley (born 1952), American diplomat
 Thomas F. "Big Tom" Foley (1852–1925), American Tammany Hall politician and saloon keeper in New York City
 Tom Foley (Australian politician) (1886–1973), Member of the Queensland Legislative Assembly
 Tom Foley (1929–2013), American Congressman and Speaker of the House
 Tom Foley (Pennsylvania politician) (born 1953), politician from Pennsylvania who became President of Mount Aloysius College

Others
 Thomas Foley (Royal Navy officer) (1757–1833), British admiral
 Thomas Patrick Roger Foley (1822–1879), American religious leader
 Thomas Foley, journalist and friend of Ian Holbourn, who married RMS Lusitania survivor Avis Dolphin
 Tom Foley (infielder) (born 1959), American baseball player and coach
 Tom Foley (outfielder) (1847–1896), American baseball player
 Tom Foley (racehorse trainer) (1946–2021), Irish racehorse trainer

The Barons Foley and family
Thomas Foley (died 1677) (1616–1677), British ironmaster, builder of Witley Court estate, member of Parliament for Bewdley
Thomas Foley (died 1701) (–1701), son of previous, member of Parliament for Worcestershire, and then Droitwich
Thomas Foley, 1st Baron Foley (1673–1733), son of previous, member of Parliament for Stafford, and then Droitwich
Thomas Foley, 2nd Baron Foley (1703–1766), son of previous, never married, rebuilt  parish church of Great Witley
Thomas Foley (auditor of the imprests) (c. 1670–1737), of Stoke Edith, member of Parliament for Weobly, then Hereford, then Stafford
Thomas Foley (died 1749) (–1749), son of previous, member of Parliament for Hereford, then Herefordshire
Thomas Foley, 1st Baron Foley (1716–1777), son of previous, member of Parliament for Droitwich, then Herefordshire, inherited the Witley Court estate from his cousin, the 2nd  baron
Thomas Foley, 2nd Baron Foley (1742–1793), son of previous, member of Parliament for Herefordshire, then Droitwich
Thomas Foley, 3rd Baron Foley (1780–1833), son of previous, member of Parliament and Captain of the Honourable Corps of Gentlemen-at-Arms
Thomas Foley, 4th Baron Foley (1808–1869), son of previous, member of Parliament for Worcestershire and Captain of the Honourable Corps of Gentlemen-at-Arms
Thomas Foley (1778–1822), grandson of the first baron, member of Parliament for Herefordshire and Droitwich

See also
 Barons Foley